Espreso TV is an Internet television station in Ukraine that started to operate in November 2013. Espreso TV enabled the Euromaidan protests to be broadcast worldwide.

Ownership
The channel is owned by the media company Goldberry LLC.

Prior to August 2017 99% of Espreso TV belonged to Larysa Knyazhytska, the wife of Mykola Knyazhytsky.

In August 2017 Inna Avakova (the wife of former Minister of Internal Affairs Arsen Avakov) acquired 40% of Goldberry LLC and Arseniy Yatsenyuk (former Prime Minister) acquired 30%; the remaining 30% of Goldberry LLC stayed in the possession of Larysa Knyazhytska.

History
On 22 January 2014, a journalist of Espreso TV Dmytro Dvoychenkov was kidnapped, beaten, and taken to an unknown location. He was later released.

See also 
 Hromadske.TV

References

External links 
 Official site
 Espresso TV brings Kiev protests to world’s screens with ToolsOnAir
 Kyiv Post, Police assault journalist providing live video for Espresso TV 
 Ukraine's revolution is being live-streamed

Television stations in Ukraine
Television channels and stations established in 2013
Internet properties established in 2013
Internet television channels
Ukrainian brands
Organizations based in Kyiv
2013 establishments in Ukraine
Streaming television in Ukraine
Mass media of the Euromaidan
Ukrainian-language television stations in Ukraine